The Texas scarlet snake (Cemophora lineri) is a species of nonvenomous snake in the family Colubridae. The species is endemic to the South Central United States. It was previously considered a subspecies of Cemophora coccinea.

Etymology
The specific name or epithet, lineri, is in honor of American herpetologist Ernest A. Liner (1925–2010), who collected the first specimen in 1963.

Geographic range
C. lineri is found in southern Texas. Its range does not overlap with the other species of scarlet snake.

Description
The Texas scarlet snake is the larger of the two scarlet snake species, and is capable of growing to a total length (including tail) of 66 cm (26 inches). It has a gray or white background color, with distinct red blotches that have black borders. Unlike the other species, the black borders do not join on the sides. Its belly is a solid white or gray.

Behavior
Like all scarlet snakes (genus Cemophora), the Texas scarlet snake is a secretive burrower, spending most of its time under ground. It prefers sandy thicket habitats along the Gulf of Mexico coastline.

Diet
The preferred diet of C. lineri is the eggs of other reptiles, but it will also eat small rodents and lizards.

References

External links

Further reading
Behler JL, King FW (1979). The Audubon Society Field Guide to North American Reptiles and Amphibians. New York: Alfred A. Knopf. 743 pp. . (Cemophora coccinea lineri, p. 593).
Conant R (1975). A Field Guide to Reptiles and Amphibians of Eastern and Central North America, Second Edition. Boston: Houghton Mifflin. xviii + 429 pp. + Plates 1-48  (hardcover),  (paperback). (Cemophora coccinea lineri, p. 212 + Map 152).
Smith HM, Brodie ED Jr (1982). Reptiles of North America: A Guide to Field Identification. New York: Golden Press. 240 pp.  (paperback),  (hardcover). (Cemophora coccinea lineri, p. 178).
Weinell, Jeffrey L.; Austin, Christopher C. (2017). "Refugia and Speciation in North American Scarlet Snakes (Cemophora)". Journal of Herpetology 51: 161–171. (Cemophora lineri, new status).
Williams KL, Brown BC, Wilson LD (1966). "A new subspecies of the colubrid snake Cemophora coccinea (Blumenbach) from Southern Texas". Texas Journal of Science 18: 85–88. (Cemophora coccinea lineri, new subspecies).

Cemophora
Reptiles of the United States
Fauna of the Southwestern United States
Taxa named by Kenneth L. Williams